Ibrahim Salah (born 30 August 2001) is a Moroccan professional footballer who plays as a winger for Ligue 1 club Rennes.

Club career

Gent
A youth product of Union Saint-Gilloise and Beerschot, In 2020 he was set to join Leicester City F.C. but the move failed for administrative reasons. Salah joined the youth academy of Gent on 28 May 2021. He signed his first professional contract with the club on 27 December 2021. In the summer of 2022, he started training with the senior team in preparation for the 2022–23 season. He made his senior and Belgian First Division A debut with the club as a substitute in a 2–1 win against Westerlo on 7 August 2022. In the opening months of the 2022–23 season Gent head coach Hein Vanhaezebrouck
gave young players the chance to play in the first team such as Salah, Malick Fofana and Noah De Ridder. Salah and Fofana made their debut in that same game together against Westerloo. Vanhaezebrouck praised Salah for his efforts in training and said his standard was high enough to send a message to the more experienced players, and that he earned his place on merit. In 2023, he was join Stade Rennais FC in the last hours of transfer market.

Rennes
On 31 January 2023, Salah joined Ligue 1 side Rennes. He scored his first goal for the club on 23 February 2023 as a substitute in a 2–1 home win over Shakhtar Donetsk in the UEFA Europa League knockout round play-offs, a 106th minute goal that put Rennes ahead on aggregate. However, his team eventually lost in a penalty shoot-out after Shakhtar Donetsk equalized later in extra time.

International career
Born in Belgium, Salah is of Moroccan descent. He was called up to the Morocco U23s for a training camp in November 2022.

References

External links
 

2001 births
Living people
Belgian footballers
Belgian sportspeople of Moroccan descent
Association football wingers
K.A.A. Gent players
Stade Rennais F.C. players
Belgian National Division 1 players
Belgian Pro League players
Ligue 1 players
Belgian expatriate footballers
Expatriate footballers in France
Belgian expatriate sportspeople in France